John T. Manske (born November 6, 1952) is a former member of the Wisconsin State Assembly.

Early life
Manske was born in Edgerton, Wisconsin. He graduated from Milton High School in Milton, Wisconsin before obtaining a B.S. from the University of Wisconsin-Whitewater and an M.A. from the University of Wisconsin-Madison. Manske worked as a part-time college instructor and production worker before beginning his political career.

Career
He was elected as a Republican candidate to the Milton City Council in 1973. He served on the city council from 1973-1977 and from 1979-1981. In 1981, he won a special election to serve as a member of the Wisconsin State Assembly representing the 47th district. He won reelection in 1982 and 1984, serving as a member of the Assembly from 1981 until 1986. In 1988, he was hired by the Illinois chapter of Common Cause to serve as its executive director.

References

People from Edgerton, Wisconsin
Republican Party members of the Wisconsin State Assembly
Wisconsin city council members
University of Wisconsin–Whitewater alumni
University of Wisconsin–Madison alumni
1952 births
Living people
People from Milton, Wisconsin